Michelle Dillon (born 24 May 1973 in Wembley, England) is a retired British triathlete.

Dillon's first Olympic triathlon was at the 2000 Summer Olympics. She was one of the three British athletes, along with Sian Brice and Andrew Johns, not to finish the competition. Four years later, at the 2004 Summer Olympics, Dillon finished in sixth place with a time of 2:06:00.77.

Before turning to the triathlon, she was a runner, competing for Australia at the 1994 Commonwealth Games.

Michelle has been a coach for many triathletes including Stuart Hayes and Emma Pallant.  She returned to competitive sport on 3 April 2016 coming second in the British Duathlon Championships. In 2018 she became 45-49F World Triathlon Champion on the Gold Coast.

Selected results
 2000 Summer Olympics: DNF
 2004 Summer Olympics: 6th, 2:06:00.77
 2007 Győr ITU World Duathlon Championships: 2nd, 1:54:43

References

External links
 ITU Profile

1973 births
Living people
Australian female long-distance runners
English female triathletes
British female triathletes
Triathletes at the 2000 Summer Olympics
Triathletes at the 2004 Summer Olympics
Olympic triathletes of Great Britain
Sportspeople from Wembley
Duathletes
Athletes (track and field) at the 1994 Commonwealth Games
Triathletes at the 2002 Commonwealth Games
Commonwealth Games competitors for England
Commonwealth Games competitors for Australia